Cristhian Stivens Maciel Gallo (born 12 February 1992) is an Uruguayan professional footballer, who plays as a central midfielder.

Club career

Club Atlético River Plate
Maciel started his career playing with River Plate. He made his professional debut during the 2012/13 season.

Jocoro
Maciel signed with Jocoro of the Salvadoran Primera División in the Apertura 2018 tournament. Jocoro was the newly promoted team for this tournament. In September 2018, Maciel suffered a severe injury in a game against Luis Ángel Firpo. Jocoro won 3–1.

However, Maciel returned with the team for a game against Chalatenango.

References

1992 births
Living people
Uruguayan footballers
Association football defenders
Club Atlético River Plate (Montevideo) players
Footballers from Montevideo